Shannon and the Clams is an indie garage punk quartet based in Oakland, California. Known for a vintage sound that incorporates elements of doo-wop, classic R&B, garage psych, and surf, Shannon and the Clams has drawn comparisons to both Buddy Holly and 1960s girl groups. They are also said to love "music from '50s oldies to '80s punk".

History 
The band includes vocals from bassist Shannon Shaw, guitarist Cody Blanchard, and keyboardist Will Sprott, along with drums by Nate Mahan. Shaw and Blanchard met at the California College of the Arts, where they began performing together. Shaw is also a member of queercore punk outfit Hunx and His Punx.

Shannon and the Clams' debut album, I Wanna Go Home, was released in 2009. In 2011, the group followed up with their sophomore effort, Sleep Talk. Their third album, Dreams in the Rat House, was released in May 2013.

Their album Gone by the Dawn is described by Still in Rock as "the most beautiful manifestation in recent years of what I would call the 'Elvis Presley culture'".

Released in 2018, Onion was Shannon and the Clams' first release on Dan Auerbach's Easy Eye Sound label. Auerbach also produced the album.

Reception
A reviewer at Still in Rock stated that their "shows are among the best in the world, with an inexhaustible spirit and a musical style with no equivalent. Its influence on the independent scene is one of the greatest, together with Ty Segall and very few others."

A reviewer at Punknews.org wrote that Shannon and the Clams has the "sound of a prom band in 1964 getting dosed with acid and having the sweetest lovelorn freak out. Imagine a brawling Etta James, backed up by the 13th Floor Elevators singing Shangri La's tunes." The Chicago Reader'''s Jessica Hopper described Shannon and the Clams as "something from a John Waters lucid dream... complete with horny teenage anthems that walk the line between greasy, frantic 50s rock 'n' roll and innocent, hip-swinging 60s pop."

In an effusive review of Onion, Allison Wolfe wrote: "Reminiscent of the Collins Kids, both Shannon and Cody's voices mingle and soar, and I often can't tell their beautiful articulations apart. No matter – this is a gorgeously sincere and infectious body of work that I can't put down."

Band members
 Shannon Shaw – (vocals, bass)
 Cody Blanchard – (vocals, guitar)
 Nate Mahan – (drums)
 Will Sprott – (vocals, keyboards)Guest Members''
 Eric Moore - (drums - Australian Tour 2022)
 Chris Icasiano - (drums)
 Garett Goddard - (drums)

Discography

Studio albums

Singles and Eps

References

External links

Official website
Shannon and the Clams on MySpace
Shannon and the Clams Documentary

Garage punk groups
Indie rock musical groups from California
Musical groups established in 2009
Musical groups from Oakland, California
2009 establishments in California
Hardly Art artists